Coline Devillard (born 9 October 2000) is a French artistic gymnast. Devillard is the 2022 World bronze medalist, the 2017 European Champion, and the 2019 European silver medalist on vault. She was the first French female gymnast to win the European title on vault.  Additionally she was part of the French team that won silver at the 2018 European Championships which was France's best European team finish ever.

Personal life 
Coline Devillard was born in Saint-Vallier, Drôme, France, on 9 October 2000. Her hobbies include shopping, and she hopes to become a fitness trainer.

Junior career

2012-2013 
Devillard's international debut was at the 2012 Élite Gym Massilia where she placed sixth with her team and fifteenth in the all-around. She did not compete during the 2013 season.

2014 
Devillard competed at the French National Championships and finished eighth in the all-around with a score of 49.500. She competed at the International Tournoi Combs-la-Ville and won gold on vault and beam and won bronze with the team. Additionally, she placed fifth in the all-around and fourth on floor.

2015 
At the National Championships, Devillard won a silver medal on vault behind Camille Bahl, and she finished twelfth in the junior all-around final. Devillard won a gold medal with the French team at the FRA-GBR-SUI Junior Friendly. She then competed at the Flanders International Team Challenge and finished fourth with the team. She ended her season at the Élite Gym Massilia with a bronze medal in the Open All-Around and a sixth-place finish on vault.

Senior career

2016 
At the National Championships, Devillard finished twelfth in the senior all-around and won the gold medal on vault. Devillard was ultimately not named to the French 2016 Olympic Team. Afterwards, Devillard competed at the French Review where she won a gold medal on vault, a silver medal on balance beam, and a bronze medal in the all-around. She ended her first senior season at the Élite Gym Massilia with a gold medal on vault and a twenty-third-place finish in the all-around.

2017 
Devillard was selected to compete at the 2017 European Championships, and she became the first French gymnast to win the European title on vault. She then won the gold on vault at the Paris World Cup. At the World Championships, Devillard fell on one of her vaults in the qualification and did not make it into the event final.

2018 
Devillard began her season with a bronze medal on vault at the Doha World Cup. At the National Championships, she placed sixth in the all-around and won silver on vault despite falling on both vaults. At the Sainté Gym Cup, Devillard won gold medals with the team and on vault, and she won a bronze medal on floor. Devillard was selected to compete with Juliette Bossu, Marine Boyer, Lorette Charpy, and Melanie de Jesus dos Santos at the 2018 European Championships, and the team won a silver medal. Individually, Devillard finished sixth on vault. Devillard could not go to the World Championships because of an ankle injury.

2019 
Devillard started her season at the Baku World Cup where she finished fourth on vault. Devillard won a bronze medal on vault at the 2019 Doha World Cup in addition to finishing eighth on floor. At the 2019 European Championships, Devillard won a silver medal on vault behind Maria Paseka. After the competition, Devillard said "I dreamt of this medal, I knew I could do something. I succeeded on both of my vaults. One could always do better, but I’ve come back, and I’ve repeated a medal... Given that [Paseka's] start value was mega high, with two-tenths more than mine, she was automatically the favorite. And she did her job. But I am also going to augment my difficulty value next year, and we’ll see who will win."

On 3 September Devillard was named to the team to compete at the 2019 World Championships in Stuttgart, Germany alongside Lorette Charpy, Marine Boyer, Mélanie de Jesus dos Santos, and Aline Friess.  She later had to withdraw due to an ankle injury.

2020 
Devillard competed at the Melbourne World Cup in February where she won silver on vault, finishing behind Jade Carey.  She later competed at the Baku World Cup; during qualifications she finished second on vault behind Teja Belak and therefore qualified to the event finals.  However event finals were canceled due to the 2020 coronavirus outbreak in Azerbaijan.

2022 
In October Devillard was named to the team to compete at the World Championships in Liverpool alongside Marine Boyer, Mélanie de Jesus dos Santos, Aline Friess, and Carolann Héduit. She competed in the vault final and won the bronze medal; this was the first individual medal for a French female gymnast at the World Championships since 2009.

Competitive history

References

External links
 
 

2000 births
Living people
French female artistic gymnasts
European champions in gymnastics
Medalists at the World Artistic Gymnastics Championships
21st-century French women